Evesham Rowing Club is a rowing club on the River Avon, based at The Boathouse, Abbey Park, Evesham, Worcestershire.

History
The club was founded in 1863 and has facilities for all age groups.

The club won the prestigious Fawley Challenge Cup at the Henley Regatta in 2002, as part of the composite crew with Leander and has produced multiple national champions.

Honours

British champions

Henley Royal Regatta

References

Sport in Worcestershire
Rowing clubs in England
Rowing clubs of the River Avon
Evesham